Shwe yin aye is a traditional Burmese dessert commonly associated with the Thingyan season.

The dessert consists of sweetened sticky rice, sago pearls, pandan jelly noodles (cendol), and cubes of kyaukkyaw, coconut jelly, and a slice of white bread steeped in a concoction of sweetened coconut milk, served cold.

References

Burmese cuisine
Foods containing coconut
Burmese desserts and snacks